SpaceX Crew-6 is the sixth crewed operational NASA Commercial Crew flight of a Crew Dragon spacecraft, and the ninth overall crewed orbital flight.  The mission launched on 2 March 2023 at 05:34:14 UTC, and it successfully docked to the International Space Station (ISS) on 3 March 2023 at 06:40 UTC. The Crew-6 mission transported four crew members to the International Space Station (ISS).  Two NASA astronauts, a United Arab Emirates astronaut, and a Russian cosmonaut were assigned to the mission.  The two NASA astronauts are Stephen Bowen and Warren Hoburg.  The cosmonaut, Andrey Fedyaev, was reassigned from Soyuz MS-23.  Sultan Al Neyadi will head the Emirates' mission on the flight.

Crew 
On 24 March 2022 the European Space Agency announced that Danish astronaut Andreas Mogensen will serve as backup pilot. On 29 April 2022, the Mohammed bin Rashid Space Centre (MBRSC) and Axiom Space announced that Crew-6 will also include an astronaut from the United Arab Emirates. 

MBRSC participation in this mission is a by product of a 2021 agreement between NASA and Axiom to fly a NASA astronaut, Mark T. Vande Hei, onboard Soyuz MS-18 (launch) and Soyuz MS-19 (return) in order to ensure a continuing American presence onboard the ISS. In return, Axiom received the rights to a NASA owned seat onboard SpaceX Crew-6. Axiom provided the flight opportunity to MBRSC professional crew member through an agreement with the United Arab Emirates Space Agency. Later the astronaut was confirmed to be Sultan Al Neyadi.
Andrey Fedyaev was selected in July 2022 for this mission as a part of the Soyuz-Dragon crew swap system of keeping at least one NASA astronaut and one Roscosmos cosmonaut on each of the crew rotation missions. This ensures both countries have a presence on the station, and the ability to maintain their separate systems if either Soyuz or commercial crew vehicles are grounded for an extended period.

Mission 
The sixth SpaceX operational mission in the Commercial Crew Program (CCP) was launched on 2 March 2023 and is planned to last approximately six months.  The mission was scheduled to launch early on 27 February 2023.  However, the initial attempt was scrubbed and rescheduled for 2 March 2023, at 5:34 am UTC.  The second launch attempt was successful.

Alongside Crew-6, the space capsule is designed to bring back the Soyuz MS-22 crew, serving as an emergency evacuation after Crew-5 along with Soyuz MS-23.

Launch attempt
The first launch attempt was scrubbed at T−02:12 minutes due to an issue with the TEA-TEB spontaneous ignition fluid. (times are UTC)

References 

SpaceX Dragon 2
Spacecraft launched in 2023
SpaceX payloads contracted by NASA
SpaceX human spaceflights
2023 in the United States
Fully civilian crewed orbital spaceflights